Sümber (Mongolian: Сүмбэр, Sumeru) is a frequent compound in Mongolian place names. It may refer to:

 Govisümber Province
 Sümber, Töv
 Sümber, Govisümber

See also
 Sumber (disambiguation)